Sonner Hall, also known as "Main Building" and Sonner-Payne Hall, is a historic building located at Randolph-Macon Academy in Front Royal, Warren County, Virginia. It was built in 1927, to replace the original academy building of 1892.  It is a 3 1/2-story, 19 bay, Colonial Revival style brick building. The front facade features a tetrastyle pedimented portico with Greek Ionic order columns.  It has a slate-covered gambrel roof topped by a ribbed dome with a balustrade and lantern.  In 1995, a fire destroyed the third and fourth floors of Sonner-Payne Hall.  Sonner-Payne Hall was subsequently gutted and rebuilt with improvements.

It was listed on the National Register of Historic Places in 1987.

References

School buildings on the National Register of Historic Places in Virginia
Colonial Revival architecture in Virginia
School buildings completed in 1927
Schools in Warren County, Virginia
National Register of Historic Places in Warren County, Virginia
Front Royal, Virginia
1927 establishments in Virginia